Prionospio is a genus of annelids belonging to the family Spionidae.

The genus has cosmopolitan distribution.

Species:

Prionospio acuta 
Prionospio alexandrae 
Prionospio aluta 
Prionospio amarsupiata 
Prionospio anatolica 
Prionospio andamanensis 
Prionospio anneae 
Prionospio anuncata 
Prionospio atrovitta 
Prionospio aucklandica 
Prionospio austella 
Prionospio australiensis 
Prionospio biancoi 
Prionospio bocki 
Prionospio branchilucida 
Prionospio capensis 
Prionospio caribensis 
Prionospio caspersi 
Prionospio cerastae 
Prionospio chilensis 
Prionospio cinthyae 
Prionospio cirrifera 
Prionospio convexa 
Prionospio cooki 
Prionospio coorilla 
Prionospio cornuta 
Prionospio corrugata 
Prionospio crassumbranchiata 
Prionospio cristata 
Prionospio cristaventralis 
Prionospio dayi 
Prionospio decipiens 
Prionospio delta 
Prionospio depauperata 
Prionospio dubia 
Prionospio dubia 
Prionospio ehlersi 
Prionospio elegantula 
Prionospio elongata 
Prionospio ergeni 
Prionospio fallax 
Prionospio fauchaldi 
Prionospio festiva 
Prionospio fosterae 
Prionospio grossa 
Prionospio hartmanae 
Prionospio henriki 
Prionospio hermesia 
Prionospio heterobranchia 
Prionospio jamaicensis 
Prionospio japonica 
Prionospio jonatani 
Prionospio jubata 
Prionospio kaplani 
Prionospio kinbergi 
Prionospio kingbergi 
Prionospio kirrae 
Prionospio komaeti 
Prionospio krusadensis 
Prionospio kulin 
Prionospio laciniosa 
Prionospio lanceolata 
Prionospio lighti 
Prionospio lineata 
Prionospio lobulata 
Prionospio lylei 
Prionospio maciolekae 
Prionospio malayensis 
Prionospio malmgreni 
Prionospio marsupialia 
Prionospio membranacea 
Prionospio multibranchiata 
Prionospio multicristata 
Prionospio multipinnulata 
Prionospio mutata 
Prionospio neenae 
Prionospio newportensis 
Prionospio nielseni 
Prionospio nirripa 
Prionospio nonatoi 
Prionospio nova 
Prionospio oligopinnulata 
Prionospio orensanzi 
Prionospio oshimensis 
Prionospio pacifica 
Prionospio paradisea 
Prionospio parapari 
Prionospio patagonica 
Prionospio paucipinnulata 
Prionospio perkinsi 
Prionospio peruana 
Prionospio phuketensis 
Prionospio plumosa 
Prionospio polybranchiata 
Prionospio pulchra 
Prionospio pygmaeus 
Prionospio pyramidalis 
Prionospio quadrilamellata 
Prionospio queenslandica 
Prionospio rikardoi 
Prionospio rosariae 
Prionospio rotalis 
Prionospio rotunda 
Prionospio rugosa 
Prionospio runei 
Prionospio saccifera 
Prionospio saldanha 
Prionospio sandersi 
Prionospio sanmartini 
Prionospio sexoculata 
Prionospio sishaensis 
Prionospio solisi 
Prionospio somaliensis 
Prionospio spongicola 
Prionospio steenstrupi 
Prionospio tatura 
Prionospio tetelensis 
Prionospio texana 
Prionospio thalanji 
Prionospio tridentata 
Prionospio tripinnata 
Prionospio unilamellata 
Prionospio vallensis 
Prionospio variegata 
Prionospio vermillionensis 
Prionospio wambiri 
Prionospio wireni 
Prionospio yuriel

References

Canalipalpata
Polychaete genera